Peasmarsh is a village in East Sussex, England.

Peasmarsh may also refer to 2 other places in England:

 Peasmarsh, Somerset, near Ilminster
 Peasmarsh, Surrey, near Shalford